Perlapine, sold under the brand names Hypnodine and Pipnodine, is a hypnotic and sedative of the tricyclic group which is marketed in Japan. It acts primarily as a potent antihistamine, and also has anticholinergic, antiserotonergic, antiadrenergic, and some antidopaminergic activity. The drug has relatively weak affinity for the dopamine D2 receptor ( = 1,803 nM) and, in accordance, is said to be ineffective as an antipsychotic. However, it retains higher affinity for the dopamine D1 receptor ( = 198 nM). Its  values are 19 nM for the α1-adrenergic receptor, 4,945 nM for the α2-adrenergic receptor, and 70 nM for the serotonin 5-HT2A receptor. Perlapine is closely related to clotiapine, clozapine, fluperlapine, loxapine, and tilozepine.

Perlapine has been suggested as a potential ligand for certain DREADDs.

References

5-HT2A antagonists
Alpha-1 blockers
Dibenzodiazepines
Dopamine antagonists
H1 receptor antagonists
Muscarinic antagonists
Piperazines
Serotonin receptor antagonists